Guido Ricardo Lombardi Elías (born December 9, 1949) is a Peruvian journalist, lawyer, and politician of Italian descent.

Career 
Since 1984, he has conducted radio programs, both on Radio Programs del Peru and on Radio Nacional del Peru. In 1990, he was the moderator of the first presidential debate in the history of Peru, a debate between Mario Vargas Llosa (FREDEMO) and Alberto Fujimori (C90). In 2002, he is a regular columnist for Diario Perú.21 broadcast in Lima. He has also worked at Panamericana Televisión as host of the journalistic program "Panorama". 

He is a well-known radio host, as a political critic and host of various programs, he most remembered for hosting in 2001, the program Who wants to be a millionaire ?.

In 2001 he led the second presidential debate in Peruvian history: Alejandro Toledo (PP) against Alan García (APRA) for the 2001 general elections.

Political career 
At the beginning of the nineties, he worked as Coordinator of Promotion and Dissemination of the Instituto Libertad y Democracia chaired by Hernando de Soto.

In 2005, he was invited by Lourdes Flores to head the list of National Unity to the Andean Parliament. However, his quota was filled by Rafael Rey, so he was instead selected to run in the congressional list for Lima. He was elected as Congressman of the Republic by National Unity, being the third most voted in the coalition.

He currently works as a professor at ESAN University, teaching the Globalization and National Reality course.

References

External links
Official Congressional Site

Peruvian journalists
Male journalists
Peruvian male writers
Peruvian people of Italian descent
Living people
1949 births
National Unity (Peru) politicians
Members of the Congress of the Republic of Peru

Peruvians for Change politicians
People from Tacna
People from Tacna Region
Christian People's Party (Peru) politicians